José Luis Rodríguez Jiménez (born 1961) is a Spanish historian, considered an expert in the history of the right-wing extremism in Spain.

Biography 
Born in 1961 in Madrid, he earned a licentiate degree in history at the Complutense University of Madrid; he later obtained a PhD in the same centre in 1992 under the doctoral supervision of Antonio Fernández García reading a thesis dealing with the positions espoused by the Spanish far-right and the further evolution it experienced during the late francoist period and the Spanish transition to democracy. He is professor of Contemporary History at the King Juan Carlos University (URJC).

Works

References 
Informational notes

Citations

Bibliography
 
 
 
 
 
 
 

1961 births
Academics and writers on far-right extremism
Historians of the Spanish transition to democracy
Historians of Francoist Spain
Complutense University of Madrid alumni
People from Madrid
Living people